Kirk Academy is a K-12 Christian school in Grenada, Mississippi. It is part of the Mississippi Association of Independent Schools (MAIS). It was founded in 1966 in response to integration of the public schools and has been described as a segregation academy. As of 2018, all but 11 of the school's 385 students were white.

According to the school's website, it was founded in 1966 and named for W.H. Kirk who donated thirty acres of land for the school.

Randy Poss was headmaster for five years until April 2018.

Sports
The Raiderettes were Mississippi-Louisiana state champions in 1976. In 2018 the Raiderettes were again AAA MAIS champions with coach Amy Denley.

Alumni
Donna Tartt - Novelist.

References

External links

Educational institutions established in 1966
1966 establishments in Mississippi
Private K-12 schools in Mississippi
Christian schools in Mississippi
Education in Grenada County, Mississippi
Segregation academies in Mississippi